Difluoromethane, also called difluoromethylene, HFC-32 Methylene Fluoride or R-32, is an organic compound of the dihalogenoalkane variety. It has the formula of CH2F2. It is a colorless gas in the ambient atmosphere and is slightly soluble in the water, with a high thermal stability. Due to the low melting and boiling point, (-136.0 °C and -51.6 °C respectively) contact with this compound may result in frostbite. In the United States, the Clean Air Act Section 111 on Volatile Organic Compounds (VOC) has listed difluoromethane as an exception (since 1997) from the definition of VOC due to its low production of tropospheric ozone. Difluoromethane is commonly used in endothermic processes such as refrigeration or air conditioning.

Synthesis 
Difluoromethane is primarily synthesized via batch processes, by the reaction of dichloromethane and hydrogen fluoride (HF), in the liquid phase using SbCl5 as a catalyst. Due to hydrogen fluoride's hazardous properties, a new synthesis was developed. The new synthesis allows for constant flow of difluoromethane production through an isolated chamber.

Applications 

Difluoromethane is often used as a fire extinguishant due to its ability to undergo endothermic processes. Atmospheric concentration of difluoromethane at various latitudes since the year 2009 are shown to the left.

Difluoromethane is a molecule used as refrigerant that has prominent heat transfer and pressure drop performance, both in condensation and vaporization.   It has a 100-year global warming potential (GWP) of 675 times that of carbon dioxide, and an atmospheric lifetime of nearly 5 years. It is classified as A2L - slightly flammable by ASHRAE, and has zero ozone depletion potential (ODP).  Difluoromethane is thus a relatively low-risk choice among HFC refrigerants,  most of which have higher GWP and longer persistence when leaks occur.

The common refrigerant R-410A is a zeotropic, 50/50-mass-percent mixture of difluoromethane and pentafluoroethane (R-125).  Pentafluoroethane is a common replacement for various chlorofluorocarbons (i.e Freon) in new refrigerant systems, especially for air-conditioning. The zeotropic mix of difluoromethane with pentafluoroethane (R-125) and tetrafluoroethane (R-134a) is known as R-407A through R-407F depending on the composition. Likewise, R-504 is the azeotropic (48.2/51.8 mass%) mixture of difluoromethane and chlorotrifluoromethane (R13). In 2011 17,949,893 metric tons of difluoromethane were emitted into the atmosphere in the United States alone.

Difluoromethane is currently used by itself in residential and commercial air-conditioners in Japan, China, and India as a substitute for R-410A. In order to reduce the residual risk associated with its mild flammability, this molecule should be applied in heat transfer equipment with low refrigerant charge such as brazed plate heat exchangers (BPHE), or shell and tube heat exchangers and tube and plate heat exchangers with tube of small diameter.
Many applications confirmed that difluoromethane exhibits heat transfer coefficients higher than those of R-410A
under the same operating conditions but also higher frictional pressure drops.

Other uses of difluoromethane include its use as aerosol propellants, blowing agents, and solvents.

Environmental Effects
Every year, approximately 15 kilotons of difluoromethane are produced. In gas form, the compound will degrade in the atmosphere by reaction with photochemically-produced hydroxyl radicals. This process will form carbonyl difluoride. The half-life for this process is estimated to be 4 years. Difluoromethane tends to enter the environment via the gas phase and accumulates there more commonly than in soils or sediments. Volatilization half-lives of this compound are about 45 minutes for rivers and 69 hours for lakes,  difluoromethane does not bioaccumulate in aquatic areas well.

HFC-32 released into the environment gets broken down into CF as an intermediate product. This goes on to create HF and CO2 by hydrolysis in atmospheric water.

The global warming potential (GWP) of HFC-32 is estimated at 677 on a 100-year time window. This is far lower than the GWP for HFC refrigerants it is replacing, but remains sufficiently high to spur continued research into using lower-GWP refrigerants.

Difluoromethane is excluded from the list of VOCs supplied in the United States Clean Air Act due to the ODP being zero. Therefore, tropospheric ozone is not likely to be produced from this molecule. Tropospheric ozone may lead to adverse health effects such as respiratory, cardiac or neurological damage. Additionally, ozone can affect plant and vegetation by inducing the bronzing of leaves.

Toxicity 
Difluoromethane shows slight maternal and developmental toxicity at concentrations of approximately 50,000 ppm in rats, but not in rabbits. The exposure limitations set on difluoromethane for human use are 1,000 ppm, making exposure to dangerous levels unlikely.

References

External links 
 Flammability Measurements of Difluoromethane in Air at 100 °C 
 Difluoromethane at Gas Encyclopaedia 
 IR absorption spectra
SDS Data sheet

Fluoroalkanes
Halomethanes
Refrigerants